In computer science and data mining, MinHash (or the min-wise independent permutations locality sensitive hashing scheme) is a technique for quickly estimating how similar two sets are. It has also been applied in large-scale clustering problems, such as clustering documents by the similarity of their sets of words.

Jaccard similarity and minimum hash values
The Jaccard similarity coefficient is a commonly used indicator of the similarity between two sets.

This value is 0 when the two sets are disjoint, 1 when they are equal, and strictly between 0 and 1 otherwise. Two sets are more similar (i.e. have relatively more members in common) when their Jaccard index is closer to 1. The goal of MinHash is to estimate  quickly, without explicitly computing the intersection and union.

(In cases where the hash function used is assumed to have pseudo-random properties, the random permutation would not be used.)

The probability of this being true is exactly the Jaccard index, therefore:

That is, the probability that  is true is equal to the similarity , assuming drawing  from a uniform distribution. The idea of the MinHash scheme is to reduce this variance by averaging together several variables constructed in the same way.

Algorithm

Variant with many hash functions

Therefore, for any constant  there is a constant  such that the expected error of the estimate is at most .  For example, 400 hashes would be required to estimate  with an expected error less than or equal to .05.

Variant with a single hash function
It may be computationally expensive to compute multiple hash functions, but a related version of MinHash scheme avoids this penalty by using only a single hash function and uses it to select multiple values from each set rather than selecting only a single minimum value per hash function. Let  be a hash function, and let  be a fixed integer.
This subset  is used as a signature for the set , and the similarity of any two sets is estimated by comparing their signatures.

Specifically, let A and B be any two sets.
The subset  is the set of members of  that belong to the intersection . The difference between this estimator and the estimator produced by multiple hash functions is that  always has exactly  members, whereas the multiple hash functions may lead to a smaller number of sampled elements due to the possibility that two different hash functions may have the same minima. However, when  is small relative to the sizes of the sets, this difference is negligible.

By standard Chernoff bounds for sampling without replacement, this estimator has expected error , matching the performance of the multiple-hash-function scheme.

Time analysis
The estimator  can be computed in time  from the two signatures of the given sets, in either variant of the scheme. The signature of each set can be computed in linear time on the size of the set, so when many pairwise similarities need to be estimated this method can lead to a substantial savings in running time compared to doing a full comparison of the members of each set. Specifically, for set size  the many hash variant takes  time. The single hash variant is generally faster, requiring  time to maintain the queue of minimum hash values assuming .

Incorporating weights
A variety of techniques to introduce weights into the computation of MinHashes have been developed. The simplest extends it to integer weights.
Extend our hash function  to accept both a set member and an integer, then generate multiple hashes for each item, according to its weight. If item  occurs  times, generate hashes . Run the original algorithm on this expanded set of hashes. Doing so yields the weighted Jaccard Index as the collision probability.

 

Further extensions that achieve this collision probability on real weights with better runtime have been developed, one for dense data, and another for sparse data.

Another family of extensions use exponentially distributed hashes. A uniformly random hash between 0 and 1 can be converted to follow an exponential distribution by CDF inversion. This method exploits the many beautiful properties of the minimum of a set of exponential variables.

 

This yields as its collision probability the probability Jaccard index

Min-wise independent permutations
In order to implement the MinHash scheme as described above, one needs the hash function  to define a random permutation on  elements, where  is the total number of distinct elements in the union of all of the sets to be compared. Because of this fact, by analogy to the theory of universal hashing, there has been significant work on finding a family of permutations that is "min-wise independent", meaning that for any subset of the domain, any element is equally likely to be the minimum. It has been established that a min-wise independent family of permutations must include at least

different permutations, and therefore that it needs  bits to specify a single permutation, still infeasibly large.

Practical min-wise independent hash functions

Because of the above impracticality, two variant notions of min-wise independence have been introduced: restricted min-wise independent permutations families, and approximate min-wise independent families.
Restricted min-wise independence is the min-wise independence property restricted to certain sets of cardinality at most .
Approximate min-wise independence has at most a fixed probability  of varying from full independence.

In 1999 Piotr Indyk proved that any k-wise independent family of hash functions is also approximately min-wise independent for  large enough.
In particular, there are constants  such that if , then

(Note, here  means the probability is at most a factor  too big, and at most  too small.)

This guarantee is, among other things, sufficient to give the Jaccard bound required by the MinHash algorithm.

Since k-wise independent hash functions can be specified using just  bits, this approach is much more practical than using completely min-wise independent permutations.

Another practical family of hash functions that give approximate min-wise independence is Tabulation hashing.

Applications
The original applications for MinHash involved clustering and eliminating near-duplicates among web documents, represented as sets of the words occurring in those documents. Similar techniques have also been used for clustering and near-duplicate elimination for other types of data, such as images: in the case of image data, an image can be represented as a set of smaller subimages cropped from it, or as sets of more complex image feature descriptions.

In data mining,  use MinHash as a tool for association rule learning. Given a database in which each entry has multiple attributes (viewed as a 0–1 matrix with a row per database entry and a column per attribute) they use MinHash-based approximations to the Jaccard index to identify candidate pairs of attributes that frequently co-occur, and then compute the exact value of the index for only those pairs to determine the ones whose frequencies of co-occurrence are below a given strict threshold.

The MinHash algorithm has been adapted for bioinformatics, where the problem of comparing genome sequences has a similar theoretical underpinning to that of comparing documents on the web. MinHash-based tools  allow rapid comparison of whole genome sequencing data with reference genomes (around 3 minutes to compare one genome with the 90000 reference genomes in RefSeq), and are suitable for speciation and maybe a limited degree of microbial sub-typing. There are also applications for metagenomics  and the use of MinHash derived algorithms for genome alignment and genome assembly. Accurate average nucleotide identity (ANI) values can be generated very efficiently with MinHash-based algorithms.

Other uses
The MinHash scheme may be seen as an instance of locality sensitive hashing, a collection of techniques for using hash functions to map large sets of objects down to smaller hash values in such a way that, when two objects have a small distance from each other, their hash values are likely to be the same. In this instance, the signature of a set may be seen as its hash value. Other locality sensitive hashing techniques exist for Hamming distance between sets and cosine distance between vectors; locality sensitive hashing has important applications in nearest neighbor search algorithms. For large distributed systems, and in particular MapReduce, there exist modified versions of MinHash to help compute similarities with no dependence on the point dimension.

Evaluation and benchmarks
A large scale evaluation was conducted by Google in 2006   to compare the performance of Minhash and SimHash algorithms. In 2007 Google reported using Simhash for duplicate detection for web crawling and using Minhash and LSH for Google News personalization.

See also
 Bloom filter
 SimHash
 w-shingling
 Count–min sketch

References

Hash functions
Clustering criteria
Hashing
Probabilistic data structures